David Smith (born 12 October 1915 – 26 January 1998) was an English professional footballer who played as an inside-forward in the English Football League.

Playing career
Smith made his only appearance for Newcastle in a 1–1 draw against Burnley at St James' Park in the Second Division. During the Second World War, Smith guested for Derby County and Glasgow Rangers before joining Northampton Town in 1946.

Managerial career
After retiring as a player during the 1950–51 season, Smith stayed on at Northampton in a coaching capacity before becoming club secretary until 1954. He was then offered the managers job following the departure of Bob Dennison to Middlesbrough in July. His most notable achievement was taking Northampton Town to the fourth round of the 1957–58 FA Cup, defeating First Division Arsenal 3–1 in the third round, before losing to Liverpool.

Career statistics

Managerial statistics
Source:

References

1915 births
English footballers
Association football forwards
Northampton Town F.C. players
English Football League players
English football managers
English Football League managers
1998 deaths